Newington Forest is a census-designated place in Fairfax County, Virginia, United States. The population as of the 2010 census was 12,442. It is part of the Washington metropolitan area. It includes the Newington Forest subdivision and several nearby neighborhoods of southern Springfield and northern Lorton.

Geography
Newington Forest is located in southern Fairfax County. Its borders are Silver Brook and Rocky Branch to the south, Pohick Creek to the east, the Fairfax County Parkway (State Route 286) to the north, Hooes Road to the west, and Silverbrook Road to the southwest. Neighboring communities are Burke to the north, West Springfield at the northeast corner of Newington Forest, Newington to the east, Laurel Hill to the south, and Crosspointe and South Run to the west. Pohick Road runs through the center of the CDP.

References

Census-designated places in Fairfax County, Virginia
Washington metropolitan area
Census-designated places in Virginia